Brigadier General Robert Smith,  (4 September 1881 – 14 July 1928) was an Australian wool merchant and a senior officer in the Australian Army during the First World War.

References

1881 births
1928 deaths
Australian Companions of the Distinguished Service Order
Australian Companions of the Order of St Michael and St George
Australian generals
Australian military personnel of World War I
Australian wool merchants
Geelong Football Club administrators
Military personnel from Melbourne
People from Richmond, Victoria
Recipients of the Croix de guerre (Belgium)